Georgia Walker (born 7 December 1998) is an Australian rules footballer who played for the Collingwood Football Club in the AFL Women's (AFLW).

Early life and state football
Born in Rye, Walker started playing with the boys of her local club. In 2015, Walker joined the Dandenong Stingrays and was the captain of the youth girls in her two years with the club. At the same time she also played for Rye Youth Girls and for Seaford in the starting VFLW season. She won the Youth Girls Academy Challenge premiership with the Dandenong Stingrays, beating the Sandringham Dragons in the grand final, with Walker winning the best on the ground award.

AFL Women's career
She made her debut in round 3, 2017, in a match at South Pine Sports Complex against .

Walker was delisted by Collingwood ahead of the 2018 season.

Statistics
Statistics are correct to the end of the 2017 season.

|- style="background-color: #eaeaea"
! scope="row" style="text-align:center" | 2017
|style="text-align:center;"|
| 31 || 2 || 0 || 0 || 5 || 3 || 8 || 0 || 3 || 0.0 || 0.0 || 2.5 || 1.5 || 4.0 || 0.0 || 1.5
|- class="sortbottom"
! colspan=3| Career
! 2
! 0
! 0
! 5
! 3
! 8
! 0
! 3
! 0.0
! 0.0
! 2.5
! 1.5
! 4.0
! 0.0
! 1.5
|}

References

External links

 

Living people
1998 births
Collingwood Football Club (AFLW) players
Australian rules footballers from Victoria (Australia)
Sportswomen from Victoria (Australia)